Sahiden (Indeed) is the second studio album by Cypriot-Turkish singer Buray. It was released on 11 November 2016, accompanied by a music video for the song "Aşk mı Lazım". Four other music videos were released for the album. The songs were written by Buray and Gözde Ançel, and Bahadır Tanrıvermiş served as the music director.

Neziha Kartal of Habertürk gave the album a positive review and named "Sahiden" and "Ay Parçası" as the best pieces in it. In his report for NTV, Suat Kavukluoğlu also praised the variety in the album, and liked its "rich melodies and sweet lyrics".

Track listing

Charts

Release history

References 

2016 albums
Turkish-language albums
Sony Music albums